Herselt is a municipality located in the Belgian province of Antwerp. In 2021, Herselt had a total population of 14,649. The total area is 52.32 km2.

Born in Herselt
 Gregorius Thiels, abbot of Averbode.
 Stein Huysegems
 André Vlayen
 Maurice Engelen

Gallery

References

External links

 

Municipalities of Antwerp Province
Populated places in Antwerp Province